There have been two baronetcies created for persons with the surname Simeon, one in the Baronetage of England and one in the Baronetage of the United Kingdom. As of 2014 one creation is extant.

The Simeon Baronetcy, of Chilworth in the County of Oxford, was created in the Baronetage of England on 18 October 1677 for James Simeon. The title became extinct on the death of the second Baronet in 1768.

The Simeon Baronetcy, of Grazeley in the County of Berkshire, was created in the Baronetage of the United Kingdom on 22 May 1815 for John Simeon, Member of Parliament for Reading and Senior Master of the Court of Chancery. His brother was the clergyman Charles Simeon. The second Baronet represented the Isle of Wight in the House of Commons. He married Louisa Edith, daughter and heiress of Sir Fitzwilliam Barrington, 10th and last Baronet, of Barrington Hall (see Barrington baronets). The third Baronet was also Member of Parliament for the Isle of Wight while the fourth Baronet sat for Southampton. The eighth Baronet was Professor of Political Science and Law at the University of Toronto. As of 28 February 2014 the present Baronet has not successfully proven his succession and is therefore not on the Official Roll of the Baronetage, with the baronetcy considered dormant since 2013.

Two other members of the Simeon family have also gained distinction.  Charles Simeon, third son of the first Baronet, was a rear-admiral in the Royal Navy.  His great-grandson Sir Charles Edward Barrington Simeon (1889–1955) was a vice-admiral in the Royal Navy.

Simeon baronets, of Chilworth (1677)

 Sir James Simeon, 1st Baronet (died 1709)
 Sir Edward Simeon, 2nd Baronet (–1768)

Simeon baronets, of Grazeley (1815)

 Sir John Simeon, 1st Baronet (1756–1824)
 Sir Richard Godin Simeon, 2nd Baronet (1784–1854)
 Sir John Simeon, 3rd Baronet (1815–1870)
 Sir John Stephen Barrington Simeon, 4th Baronet (1850–1909)
 Sir Edmund Charles Simeon, 5th Baronet (1855–1915)
 Sir John Walter Barrington Simeon, 6th Baronet (1886–1957)
 Sir John Edmund Barrington Simeon, 7th Baronet (1911–1999)
 Sir Richard Edmund Barrington Simeon, 8th Baronet (1943–2013)
 Sir Stephen George Barrington Simeon, 9th Baronet (born 1970)

References

Kidd, Charles, Williamson, David (editors). Debrett's Peerage and Baronetage (1990 edition). New York: St Martin's Press, 1990,

External links
Biography of Sir Richard Simeon, 8th Baronet

Simeon
Simeon
1677 establishments in England
Simeon family